Fulmer may refer to:

 Fulmer, a village in Buckinghamshire, England
 A type of bit ring on horse bits
 Fulmer Falls, a waterfall in Pennsylvania, USA
 Fulmer Research Institute, A UK research and development organization (1945-1990)
 Michael Fulmer, American baseball player
 Phillip Fulmer, former head football coach at the University of Tennessee
 Fulmer Creek, a creek in upstate New York, USA

See also
 Fulmar (disambiguation)